Rande Gerber  (born April 27, 1962) is an American businessman and former model. He founded tequila brand Casamigos alongside actor George Clooney and real estate businessman Mike Meldman, as well as nightlife companies Midnight Oil, Caliche Rum, and Gerber Group, with a portfolio that has consisted of nightlife industry, such as restaurants, bars and lounges worldwide. He is married to supermodel Cindy Crawford and father to model Kaia Gerber.

Early life
Gerber grew up in Hewlett, New York, on Long Island, and graduated in 1980 from Hewlett High School. He attended the University of Arizona and graduated with a BA in marketing. He is the son of Jordan Gerber and Ellen Peckman. Gerber is of Russian Jewish descent.

Career
Gerber's Gerber Group opened its first venue, the bar The Whiskey in the Paramount Hotel in New York City, in 1991. In 2013, he partnered with George Clooney to launch Casamigos Tequila. In June 2017, it was sold to Diageo for $700 million, with an additional $300 million possible depending on the company's performance over the next ten years.

In January 2019, it was announced that Gerber and his partner, Mike Meldman, Jeff Shell, and Jay Sures would purchase Nate 'n Al of Beverly Hills and keep it open.

Personal life
Gerber married model Cindy Crawford on May 29, 1998. They have two children, son Presley Walker Gerber (born July 2, 1999) and daughter Kaia Jordan Gerber (born September 3, 2001), both of whom started modeling careers while growing up. In August 2021, the couple sold their home in Trousdale Estates, Beverly Hills, for a reported $13.5 million.

References

External links
The Gerber Group

Casamigos

Living people
American entertainment industry businesspeople
Male models from New York (state)
Businesspeople from Queens, New York
George W. Hewlett High School alumni
People from Hewlett, New York
20th-century American Jews
University of Arizona alumni
American chief executives of food industry companies
People from Queens, New York
1962 births
21st-century American Jews